The 1994–95 Scottish League Cup was the 49th staging of the Scotland's second most prestigious football knockout competition, also known for sponsorship reasons as the Coca-Cola Cup.

The competition was won by Raith Rovers, who defeated Celtic in a penalty shootout after a 2–2 draw in the final at Ibrox Stadium. The final was played at Ibrox because Celtic were using Hampden Park as their home ground during that season while Celtic Park was being rebuilt.

First round

Second round

Third round

Quarter-finals

Semi-finals

Final

External links
Scottish League Cup 1994/1995

Scottish League Cup seasons
League Cup